Yves Bernaert (born 27 March 1937) is a Belgian field hockey player. He competed at the 1960 Summer Olympics, the 1964 Summer Olympics and the 1968 Summer Olympics.

References

External links
 

1937 births
Living people
Belgian male field hockey players
Olympic field hockey players of Belgium
Field hockey players at the 1960 Summer Olympics
Field hockey players at the 1964 Summer Olympics
Field hockey players at the 1968 Summer Olympics
Sportspeople from Ghent